Dabuy may refer to:

Dabuy-ye Jonubi Rural District
Dabuy-ye Shomali Rural District